The Associated Press (AP), Newspaper Enterprise Association (NEA), New York Daily News (NYDN), The Sporting News (SN), and United Press (UP) were among selectors of All-Pro teams comprising players adjudged to be the best at each position in the National Football League (NFL) during the 1957 NFL season. The AP, NEA, NYDN, and UPI selected a first and second team.

Offensive selections

Quarterbacks
 Y. A. Tittle, San Francisco 49ers (AP)
 Johnny Unitas, Baltimore Colts (AP-2)

Halfbacks
 Frank Gifford, New York Giants (AP)
 Ollie Matson, Chicago Cardinals (AP)
 Hugh McElhenny, San Francisco 49ers (AP-2)
 Tommy Wilson, Los Angeles Rams (AP-2)

Fullbacks
 Jim Brown, Cleveland Browns (AP)
 Rick Casares, Chicago Bears (AP-2)

Ends
 Billy Wilson, San Francisco 49ers (AP)
 Billy Howton, Green Bay Packers (AP)
 Raymond Berry, Baltimore Colts (AP-2)
 Darrel Brewster, Cleveland Browns (AP-2)

Tackles
 Lou Creekmur, Detroit Lions (AP)
 Rosey Brown, New York Giants (AP)
 Lou Groza, Cleveland Browns (AP-2)
 Mike McCormack, Cleveland Browns (AP-2)

Guards
 Duane Putnam, Los Angeles Rams (AP)
 Dick Stanfel, Washington Redskins (AP)
 Harley Sewell, Detroit Lions (AP-2)
 Jack Stroud, New York Giants (AP-2)

Centers
 Jim Ringo, Green Bay Packers (AP)
 Larry Strickland, Chicago Bears (AP-2)

Defensive selections

Defensive ends
 Gino Marchetti, Baltimore Colts (AP)
 Gene Brito, Washington Redskins (AP)
 Andy Robustelli, New York Giants (AP-2)
 Doug Atkins, Chicago Bears (AP-2)

Defensive tackles
 Leo Nomellini, San Francisco 49ers (AP)
 Art Donovan, Baltimore Colts (AP)
 Ernie Stautner, Pittsburgh Steelers (AP-2)
 Don Colo, Cleveland Browns (AP-2)

Middle guards
 Bill George, Chicago Bears (AP)
 Sam Huff, New York Giants (AP-2)

Linebackers
 Joe Schmidt, Detroit Lions (AP)
 Marv Matuszak, San Francisco 49ers (AP)
 Chuck Bednarik, Philadelphia Eagles (AP-2)
 Les Richter, Los Angeles Rams (AP-2)

Defensive backs
 Jack Christiansen, Detroit Lions (AP)
 Bobby Dillon, Green Bay Packers (AP)
 Jack Butler, Pittsburgh Steelers (AP)
 Milt Davis, Baltimore Colts (AP)
 Dicky Moegle, San Francisco 49ers (AP-2)
 Yale Lary, Detroit Lions (AP-2)
 Don Paul, Cleveland Browns (AP-2)
 Emlen Tunnell, New York Giants (AP-2)

References

External links
 1957 NFL All-Pros – Pro-Football-Reference

All-Pro Teams
1957 National Football League season